The 2011 European Junior Swimming Championships were held from 6–10 July 2011 in Belgrade, Serbia. The Championships were organized by Ligue Européenne de Natation (LEN), the European Swimming League, and were held in a 50-meter pool. Per LEN rules, competitors were aged 15 or 16 for girls and 17 or 18 for boys.

Results

Boys

Girls

Medal table

Participating countries 
43 countries will take part in 2011 European Junior Swimming Championships with total of 505 swimmers.

References

External links 
 

2011 in swimming
2011 in Serbian sport
European Junior Swimming Championships
Swimming in Serbia
International sports competitions in Belgrade
European Junior Swimming
2010s in Belgrade
Swimming